Princess Margaret Hospital or PMH is a major acute district general hospital in south Kwai Chung, New Territories, near Lai Chi Kok, Kowloon, Hong Kong, managed by the Hospital Authority. It provides services for patients from Lai Chi Kok, Lower Kwai Chung, Tsing Yi, Tsuen Wan, and Tung Chung Districts.

Although it is not the main teaching hospital in Hong Kong, it also provides clinical teaching for medical students from medical college in Hong Kong, as well as providing internship placement. 

The hospital provides tertiary specialist services in urology and nephrology and has been widely regarded by Hong Kong people as the best specialist hospital in kidney related services and research.

Background
Princess Margaret Hospital was opened on 20 October 1975, named after the late Princess Margaret, Countess of Snowdon, sister of Queen Elizabeth II. It is the flagship hospital in the Kowloon West Cluster of the Hospital Authority.

Services
The hospital, with 1,733 beds and nearly 5,000 staff, provides 24-hour accident and emergency service and a wide range of specialist, ambulatory and convalescent services. It is a tertiary referral centre for infectious diseases, nephrology, and urology in the whole territory. It is also the cluster referral centre for oncology, renal transplant and dialysis, lithotripsy, pulmonary medicine and tuberculosis, high risk obstetrics care, and paediatric and neonatal intensive care.

A 20-bed Intensive Care Unit is also situated in the CD block of the hospital. Its specialist outpatient clinic is situated at Block K, Princess Margaret Hospital.

With the opening of the Hong Kong International Airport in July 1998, the Hospital provides acute care for international travellers. Moreover, it is one of the major receiving hospitals for victims in airport disasters.

As a specialised training institute recognised by the Hong Kong Academy of Medicine, Princess Margaret Hospital provides bedside teaching and clinical attachment for medical students and offers intern placement for graduates.

Infectious Disease Centre (IDC) and the Hospital Authority Toxicology Reference Laboratory are situated at PMH serving the entire Hospital Authority.

Lai King Building (LKB), an annex block of the hospital is situated at Lai King Hill, about 5-minute drive away from main block of PMH. It provides convalescent and rehabilitation support for PMH patients, with 268 beds, of which 93 are infirmary beds.

References

External links

Hospital buildings completed in 1975
Hospitals in Hong Kong
Kwai Chung
Lai King
Hospitals established in 1975
1975 establishments in Hong Kong